OnDeck Capital is an online small business lending company in the United States. It has offices in Chicago, IL; New York, NY; Denver, CO, and South Jordan, UT.

History 
Entrepreneur Mitch Jacobs founded OnDeck in 2006 and headquartered the company in New York City. Jacobs sought funding from VCs companies, with early investors including First Round Capital, Khosla Ventures, Village Ventures, Contour Venture Partners, RRE Ventures, SAP Ventures (now Sapphire Ventures), Google Ventures and Tiger Global Management.

OnDeck uses proprietary software to aggregate data about a business’ operations, which is processed by an algorithm that determines loan eligibility.  In 2007, the company introduced its short-term loan product and made its first loan, and by early 2010, the company had made over $50M in loans to small businesses in the U.S.

Jacobs left OnDeck in 2012, and Noah Breslow became the CEO. OnDeck completed its IPO in December 2014 and became listed on the New York Stock Exchange under the symbol ONDK, raising $230 million in the offering. In 2015, the company expanded its operations into Canada and Australia, the latter operating as OnDeck Capital Australia Pty Ltd in partnership with MYOB.

In July 2020, OnDeck was acquired by Chicago consumer lender Enova International.

Partnerships 
In June 2016, JPMorgan Chase made a deal with OnDeck to offer an online lending process to its small business customers. The bank uses OnDeck’s origination and loan servicing technology to supply small businesses with same or next-day funding. JPMorgan Chase and OnDeck announced an extension of their collaboration in August 2017.  The JPMorgan Chase partnership ended in July 2019.

OnDeck’s referral partners include Intuit QuickBooks, Angie’s List, Prosper Marketplace, Credit Karma, Wave Accounting, and WEX Inc.

OnDeck is a founding member of the Innovative Lending Platform Association (ILPA), a trade organization representing online lending and service companies that serve small businesses. In 2016, the ILPA, in partnership with the Association for Enterprise Opportunity, launched The SMART Box, a “model small business pricing disclosure...focused on empowering small businesses to better assess and compare finance options.”

OnDeck also partners with SCORE, an American non-profit that provides small businesses with free advice and mentors.

Criticisms
OnDeck Capital has been criticised for its high interest rates. In 2015, its average loan had an annual 51% interest rate. In 2014, Bloomberg BusinessWeek called OnDeck "payday lending for businesses", relying on brokers who were "less-than-scrupulous."

Awards 
 Crain’s New York Business Fast 50, 2013, 2014, 2015, 2016
 Forbes’ America’s Most Promising Companies, 2014

References 

Financial services companies established in 2006
Technology companies of the United States
Companies based in New York City
2014 initial public offerings
Companies formerly listed on the New York Stock Exchange
2020 mergers and acquisitions